Dennis Novikov and Julio Peralta were the defending champions and successfully defended their title, defeating Peter Luczak and Marc Polmans 3–6, 6–4, [12–10] in the final.

Seeds

Draw

References
 Main Draw

Tallahassee Tennis Challenger - Doubles
Tallahassee Tennis Challenger